Gharana Donga is a 1980 Indian Telugu-language action film directed by Kovelamudi Raghavendra Rao and produced by T. Trivikrama Rao for Vijaya Lakshmi Art Pictures starring Krishna, Sridevi, Rao Gopal Rao and Mohan Babu in the lead roles. K. Chakravarthy scored and composed the film's soundtrack.

The film was released on 29 March 1980; the censor certificate dated 27 March 1980. The film which marked the second collaboration of director Rao with Krishna after Bhale Krishnudu turned out to be a superhit at the box office.

Plot

Cast 
The cast of the films is as follows.

Soundtrack 
K. Chakravarthy scored and composed the film's soundtrack with the lyrics penned by Veturi Sundararama Murthy.
 Dhimikita Dhimikita — S. P. B., P. Susheela
 Vana Velisina — S. P. B., P. Susheela
 Rotte Virigi — S. P. B., P. Susheela
 O Muddu Krishna — S. P. B., P. Susheela
 Chitikela Metikela — S. P. B., P. Susheela
 Pampara Panasa — S. P. B., P. Susheela

References

External links 
 

1980 films
1980 action films
Indian action films
Films directed by K. Raghavendra Rao
Films scored by K. Chakravarthy